Bo Pho is a subdistrict in the Nakhon Thai District of Phitsanulok Province, Thailand.

Geography
Bo Pho is bordered to the north by Yang Klon, to the east by Loei Province, to the south by Noen Phoem, and to the west by Nakhon Thai.
Bo Pho lies in the Nan Basin, which is part of the Chao Phraya Watershed.

Administration
The following is a list of the subdistrict's mubans (villages):

References

Tambon of Phitsanulok province
Populated places in Phitsanulok province